Tong Kin Man (born 10 January 1985 in Hong Kong) is a former Hong Kong professional football player who played as a right back.

Club career
On 4 July 2008, Happy Valley loaned Tong to Eastern.

In 2009, Tong signed for Hong Kong First Division League club Kitchee, after half season, Tong was loaned to Tai Chung.

On 13 March 2011, Tong scored his first goal in for Tai Chung against HKFC, which the match wins 4–2.

In 2012, Tong signed for Hong Kong First Division League club Pegasus and be the team captain. He was also the assistant manager of the club in the 2012–13 season.

On 3 November 2013, Tong scored his first goal for Pegasus against Sun Hei, which the match wins 2–0.

28 October 2014, Tong scored his first goal in 2014–15 Hong Kong Premier League for Sun Pegasus against South China, which the match wins 3–0.

In June 2015, Tong returned to Hong Kong Premier League club Kitchee.

On 1 July 2022, Tong left Kitchee after 7 years with the club. 2 days later, he announced his retirement from professional football.

International career
On 27 March 2018, Tong made his debut for the Hong Kong national football team for the first time, at the age of 33, in the match against North Korea in the 2019 AFC Asian Cup qualification.

Career statistics

Club
Updated on 21 May 2021

International

Honours
Kitchee
Hong Kong Premier League: 2016–17, 2017–18, 2019–20
Hong Kong Senior Shield: 2016–17, 2018–19
Hong Kong FA Cup: 2016–17, 2017–18, 2018–19
Hong Kong Sapling Cup: 2017–18, 2019–20
Hong Kong League Cup: 2015–16
Hong Kong Community Cup: 2016–17, 2017–18
Hong Kong AFC Cup Play-Off: 2015–16

Pegasus
Hong Kong FA Cup: 2015–16

References

External links
 
 Tong Kin Man at HKFA
 

1985 births
Living people
Hong Kong footballers
Hong Kong international footballers
Association football defenders
Hong Kong First Division League players
Hong Kong Premier League players
Happy Valley AA players
Eastern Sports Club footballers
Tai Chung FC players
Metro Gallery FC players
TSW Pegasus FC players
Kitchee SC players
Association football wing halves